Koormavatara is a 2011 Indian Kannada drama film directed by Girish Kasaravalli, based on short story of the same name written by Kum. Veerabhadrappa. It stars Shikaripura Krishnamurthy, Jayanthi and Apoorva Kasaravalli in the lead roles, and Harish Raj, Cheswa, Rashmi Sumukha, Goa Dattu and Sumukha Bharadwaj feature in supporting roles. The story revolves around a government employee cast in a play to portray Mahatma Gandhi, who, on course, realizes that playing Gandhi is easier than imbibing and implementing his principles in real-life.

The film was screened in 17 film festivals and won acclaims Bangkok, New York and Vancouver. At the 59th National Film Awards, it was awarded the Best Feature Film in Kannada.

Plot
Rao, who is at the edge of retirement from government service, happens to play the role of Mahatma Gandhi in a television serial. Unknowingly the qualities of Gandhiji imbibe in him. How resurrect is the crux of the film? ‘One would certainly question himself after seeing this film' opines Dr Girish.

Cast
 Shikaripura Krishnamurthy as Anand Rao / Mahatma Gandhi
 Jayanthi as Susheela / Kasturba Gandhi
 Apoorva Kasaravalli as Chandan
 Harish Raj as Nathuram Godse
 Cheswa
 Rashmi Hariprasad
 Goa Dattu
 Praveen Rabakavi
 Sumukha Bharadwaj
 Vikram Soori as Iqbal
 Nanjunda
 H. G. Somashekar Rao
 Akki Chennabasappa
 Babu Hirannayya
 Bangalore Nagesh
 Radha Ramachandra

Production & Casting
Former President of Karnataka Film Chamber of Commerce, hotelier and actor Basanthkumar Patil is producing this film that has completed 15 days shooting in Bengaluru. "Abhinayasharadhe" Jayanthi plays the ‘Kastura Bai’ role in this film. Dr Shikaripura Krishnamurthy plays the  lead protagonist role. HG Somasekhara Rao, Goa Datthu, Ninasam Chaswa, Rashmi, Vikram Soori, Nanjunda and Apoorva Kasaravalli forms the rest of cast. Issac Thomas scores the music and G.S.Bhaskar another stalwart in cinematography, is behind the camera.

Reception

Critical response 

B S Srivani from Deccan Herald wrote "In Kanasemba Kudureyaneri, Kasaravalli had poked inside the psyche of the rural man while in “Kurmavataara” it is the suave urbanite who undergoes sharp scrutiny. But does it suffice for the moment?". A critic from Bangalore Mirror wrote  "Veteran Jayanthi and Harish Raj, both playing actors and Kastura Ba and Nathuram Godse, deliver top-class performances. The film has been released in five screens in Bangalore and there is no reason to skip it. Indulge in some Gandhian duty".

Awards
 National Film Award for Best Feature Film in Kannada

References

External links
 

2011 films
2010s Kannada-language films
Films based on short fiction
Films directed by Girish Kasaravalli
Best Kannada Feature Film National Film Award winners